Raymond Stross (22 May 1916 – 31 July 1988) was a British film producer.

Early life and education
Stross was born on 22 May 1916 in Leeds. He was educated at Abingdon School from 1929 until 1933 and was a member of the second XV rugby team.

Film
He started Sturt Stross Film Productions in 1937 becoming the second youngest director-producer in the country at the time. His company's first production was a film called The Show's the Thing He also directed the 1937 film The Reverse Be My Lot. By 1951 he owned a chain of theatres as well as being a producer. Ray Stiles, bassist with Mud and The Hollies, called himself Stross in tribute.

Personal life
He was married to actress Anne Heywood and had a son and daughter. He died in 1988 at his home in Beverly Hills, California.

Selected filmography
Producer
 The Tall Headlines (1952)
 As Long as They're Happy (1955)
 An Alligator Named Daisy (1955)
 Jumping for Joy (1956)
 The Flesh Is Weak (1957)
 The Angry Hills (1959)
 The Brain (1962)
 The Very Edge (1963)
 The Leather Boys (1964)
 Ninety Degrees in the Shade (1965)
 The Fox (1967)
 Midas Run (1969)
 I Want What I Want (1972)
 Good Luck, Miss Wyckoff (1979)

See also
 List of Old Abingdonians

References

External links

1916 births
1988 deaths
British film directors
British film producers
People educated at Abingdon School